Tsai Lee-chiao (born 12 August 1962) is a Taiwanese athlete. She competed in the women's heptathlon at the 1984 Summer Olympics.

References

1962 births
Living people
Athletes (track and field) at the 1984 Summer Olympics
Taiwanese heptathletes
Olympic athletes of Taiwan
Place of birth missing (living people)